The 14th annual Hypo-Meeting took place on 18 and 19 June 1988 in Götzis, Austria. The track and field competition featured a decathlon (men) and a heptathlon (women) event.

Men's Decathlon

Schedule

18 June

19 June

Records

Results

Women's Heptathlon

Schedule

18 June

19 June

Records

Notes

See also
Athletics at the 1988 Summer Olympics – Men's decathlon
Athletics at the 1988 Summer Olympics – Women's heptathlon

References
 decathlon2000
 decathlonfans
 1988 Year Ranking Decathlon

1988
Hypo-Meeting
Hypo-Meeting